Myroconger prolixus is an eel in the family Myrocongridae (thin eels). It was described by Peter Henry John Castle and Philippe Béarez in 1995. It is a marine, deep-water dwelling eel which was described from a female specimen and ova taken from the Kaiyo Maru Seamount off of New Caledonia, in the western Pacific Ocean. It is known to dwell at a depth range of 260–280 m. The holotype specimen measured a total length of 38.3 cm.

The species epithet prolixus means "long bodied" in Latin.

References

Eels
Fish described in 1995